Stampede is an unincorporated community in Bell County, in the U.S. state of Texas. According to the Handbook of Texas, the community had a population of 10 in 2000. It is located within the Killeen-Temple-Fort Hood metropolitan area.

History
The creek and the community's name most likely came from a cattle-driving accident. A post office was established at Stampede in 1883 and remained in operation until 1901. There was a general store in the community in 1896. It had one business and a population zenith of 62 in 1933. It lost half of its population in 1949 and had one business and a Baptist church. Its population dropped to 10 from 1964 through 2000. It had several scattered homes during that time. The community had 40 residents in 1917. It is said to have disappeared when Fort Hood was established.

Geography

Education
In 1903, Stampede had a school with 59 students enrolled and continued to operate in 1949. Today, the community is served by the Moody Independent School District.

References

Unincorporated communities in Texas
Unincorporated communities in Bell County, Texas